Zakanale  is a village in the administrative district of Gmina Konstantynów, within Biała Podlaska County, Lublin Voivodeship, in eastern Poland.

References

Villages in Biała Podlaska County
Kholm Governorate